Avicennia balanaphora is a species of tropical mangrove in the family Acanthaceae. It is endemic to Queensland, Australia, where grows in coastal and estuarine locations.

References

balanophora
Mangroves
Endemic flora of Queensland
Plants described in 1940